Ariane "Bébéy" Beyene (born 10 May 1992) is a Cameroonian footballer who played for the Cameroon women's national football team at the 2012 Summer Olympics. At club level she has played for Louves Minproff and Yaoundé (CMR).

See also
 Cameroon at the 2012 Summer Olympics

References

External links
 
 

1992 births
Living people
Cameroonian women's footballers
Cameroon women's international footballers
Place of birth missing (living people)
Footballers at the 2012 Summer Olympics
Olympic footballers of Cameroon
Women's association football midfielders